Alcaston is a village in Shropshire, England.

See also
Listed buildings in Acton Scott

External links
 
 

Villages in Shropshire